Pierce Transit, officially the Pierce County Public Transportation Benefit Area Corporation, is an operator of public transit in Pierce County, Washington. It operates a variety of services, including fixed-route buses, dial-a-ride transportation, vanpool and ride-matching for carpools. The agency's service area covers the urbanized portions of Pierce County, part of the Seattle metropolitan area, and includes the city of Tacoma.

History

Public transportation in Pierce County historically focused on the city of Tacoma, which laid its first streetcar lines in 1888. The streetcars were phased out in the 1930s and replaced with citywide bus service, with the last line closing in 1938. The operators of the streetcar and bus systems, Tacoma Transit Company, was acquired by the city government in 1961 for $750,000. Under city ownership, the system was funded by a $0.75 monthly household tax first levied in 1965.

A public transportation benefit area (PTBA) was created in 1979 with the goal of establishing a countywide bus system. On November 6, 1979, voters in Tacoma approved a 0.3 percent sales tax to fund a new transit system, the Pierce County Transportation Benefit Area or "Pierce Transit". Pierce Transit took over Tacoma Transit's routes on January 1, 1980, and over the following year annexed other systems throughout the county.

Pierce Transit began operating express bus service from Lakewood and Tacoma to Downtown Seattle on September 17, 1990. The routes were later converted into Sound Transit Express routes, funded by the regional transit authority and operated by Pierce Transit, in 1999. The agency opened its central bus hub at Tacoma Dome Station in 1997, where Sounder commuter rail and Tacoma Link light rail service began operating in 2000 and 2003, respectively.

The passage of Initiative 695 in 1999 eliminated the use of motor vehicle excise tax, a funding source for local transit throughout the state, leading to service cuts at Pierce Transit despite it later being ruled unconstitutional by the Washington Supreme Court. In 2000, 14 percent of service was reduced and a fare increase was set to temporarily make up for revenue from the tax, which made up 38 percent of the agency's operating budget. Voters approved a 0.3 percent sales tax increase to fund transit service during a special election in February 2002, preventing a planned cut in bus service of up to 45 percent, and up to 25 percent for paratransit.

Funding crisis
In 2012, Pierce Transit argued that it was in an unsustainable state due to its reserves running out, and as a result, must cut service by 53% in order to become sustainable again. Pierce Transit argued that if taxes within its service area were increased by 0.3%, Pierce Transit would not have had to cut service, and instead could have improved service by 23%. Opponents of the 0.3% tax increase in Pierce County (also known as Proposition 1) advertised a sales tax increase to 10.1% (the "highest on the West Coast"), but in reality that rate would have only applied to motor vehicles due to the state motor vehicle sales and use tax. Most taxable goods and services would have been taxed at the rate of 9.8%. 
Pierce Transit proposed a similar increase in sales tax in 2011, which was eventually rejected by the public.   Proposition 1, proposed in the 2012 general election, has also been rejected by the public.

Bus rapid transit service

Pierce Transit plans to build a bus rapid transit system, named "Stream", on several existing corridors. The first line, on Pacific Avenue between Tacoma and Spanaway, is planned to replace a  section of Route 1. The $95 million project, partially funded by Sound Transit 3 and the federal government, is scheduled to begin construction in 2021 and open in 2024.

Administration

Pierce Transit is operated by nine-member Board of Commissioners composed of elected officials throughout the county. The agency is led by the chief executive officer, who is appointed by the board. Since 2021, this position has been held by Mike Griffus. A staff of approximately 1,000 man the five departments, with over 50% working in Transit Operations.

Police
Pierce Transit contracts with the Pierce County Sheriff's Department for police services. There are currently 16 patrol deputies assigned full-time to Pierce Transit. The command staff of Pierce Transit Police include two Supervising Sergeants and the Transit Police Chief(provided by the Pierce County Sheriff's Department - under contract). The Pierce Transit system is also patrolled by 17 specially commissioned Peace Officers (Public Safety Officers).

Services
As of 2012, Pierce Transit served a  area with a population of approximately 557,000. Areas served include Auburn, Edgewood, Federal Way, Fife, Fircrest, Gig Harbor, Joint Base Lewis–McChord, Lakewood, Milton, Pacific, Purdy, Puyallup, Ruston, South Hill, Steilacoom, Tacoma and University Place.

In 2008, 19 million people utilized its services. 272 wheelchair-accessible buses circulate between 3,300 bus stops, 626 bus shelters and 28 park-and-ride lots. Additionally, Pierce Transit runs 11 transit centers and stations. Pierce Transit also provides vanpool, ridematching and express transportation between counties. Disabled passengers who are not able to use Pierce Transit's buses have access to a special transportation system called SHUTTLE.

The agency launched an on-demand ride-hail service, named "Runner", in 2020 to serve the Ruston Way corridor. It was expended to Joint Base Lewis–McChord, Spanaway/Parkland, and the Port of Tacoma in 2021.

Bus routes

Fares

Under 6 ride free with a fare-paying rider; limit is 3.
Passengers aged 6 to 18 pay youth fare.
Summer Youth Pass only valid on Pierce Transit from June to August.
Passengers 19 to 64 pay adult fare unless they have a valid regional reduced fare permit.

Fares last updated on: 3/1/2016

Facilities

Transit Centers

512 Park and Ride
72nd St Transit Center
10th and Commerce (Downtown Tacoma)
Lakewood Transit Center
Lakewood Sounder Station
Parkland Transit Center
South Hill Mall Transit Center
Tacoma Dome Station
Tacoma Mall Transit Center
TCC Transit Center

Fleet

In 1986, Pierce Transit began experimenting with compressed natural gas as a fuel source for its bus fleet by modifying two existing buses, becoming the first agency in the nation to do so. As of 2018, 118 of the 249 buses in the agency's fleet run on compressed natural gas. Other models are diesel–electric hybrids or use electric batteries.

Bus

Shuttle/Bus Plus

Vanpool

Ferry
 Steilacoom-Anderson Island Ferry

Adjoining transit agencies
King County Metro
Kitsap Transit
Intercity Transit
Washington State Ferries

References

External links

Bus transportation in Washington (state)
Paratransit services in the United States
Transit authorities with natural gas buses
Sound Transit
Transportation in Pierce County, Washington
1979 establishments in Washington (state)
Transit agencies in Washington (state)